This is a list of games developed and/or published by Midway Games, most games are owned by Warner Bros. Interactive Entertainment actually.

List of original video games

List of licensed video games
The following titles were licensed by Midway from other companies.

Arcade

Console

Notes

References

Midway Games